is a Japanese actor. He played the role of Souji Rippukan/Kyoryu Green in the 2013 Super Sentai TV series Zyuden Sentai Kyoryuger.

Biography
After graduating high school as a junior, Shiono helped his parents' restaurant instead of going to high school. While recommended from the store customers and his mother, he was a candidate in the 24th Junon Super Boy contest, which was held in 2011, he was awarded the Special Jury Prize and the Prize Aoki.

In March 2012, Shiono became affiliated with Oscar Promotion. In 2013, he appeared in Zyuden Sentai Kyoryuger as Souji Rippukan/Kyoryu Green. In the film Zyuden Sentai Kyoryuger Returns: Hundred Years After, he played Soujiro.

In 2016, Shiono performed the starring role of Masamune Date in Sengoku Basara 4 Sumeragi play.

In November 2017, Shiono became vice leader of Aoyama Omotesando X Male Troupe.

On 6 April 2019, Shiono played Kansuke Yamamoto role in Shingen-ko festival. Kansuke Yamamoto was known as a brilliant strategist and particularly known for his plan which led to victory in the fourth battle of Kawanakajima. Shingen-ko is the Guinness-registered Largest Samurai Festival in all over the world. Also, Shiono met Nagasaki Prefectural Governor to discuss about this important traditional festival on 5 April.

On 28 February 2021, Shiono left Oscar Promotion and Aoyama Omotesando X. On 12 August 2021, Shiono joined LDH Japan.

Shiono's hobbies are playing tennis and he is good at cooking crêpe. He has a motorcycle license.

Filmography

TV series

Films

Stages

MV
 " Ai wa Tomerarenai(Acoustic version) " by REFLECT REFRAIN
  「すき。ということ」/ Suki. Toiukoto by Tomomi Itano
  「タイムリープ 」/ Time Leap by Chida Ayuka
  「豆電球」/ Mame denkyu by Chida Ayuka
  「すべての帰り道に愛を」/ Subete no kaerimichi ni ai wo by Chida Ayuka

Advertisement
 " Akihisa Story " - Advertisement of Proactiv+
 " Pokémon Shirts " - Model: Akihisa Shiono - Presented by Original Stitch
 " Tokyo It Girl Beauty #132 - Color Me Tender - Man In Blue " - Cosmetic Advertisements/Makeup for men - Presented by Nylonjapan
 " Aerospace development " - TVCM - Presented by IHI Corporation
 "Shakai Infrastructure" - TVCM - Presented by IHI Corporation

References

External links
 

21st-century Japanese male actors
Japanese male models
1995 births
Living people
People from Tokyo